Revitalize The Old Northeast Industrial Bases, also Revitalize Northeast China or Northeast China Revitalization, is a policy adopted by the People's Republic of China to rejuvenate industrial bases in Northeast China. The areas targeted once functioned as the center of heavy industry in China, first under Japanese-occupation (Manchuokuo and Kwantung Leased Territory) and then under the state-led development of the People's Republic of China before reform and opening-up. Since the 1980s, the region has been heavily affected by the restructuring of the Chinese economy and the closing and consolidation of many heavy industry State-owned enterprises (SOEs). It covers three provinces: Heilongjiang, Jilin, and Liaoning, collectively referred to as Dongbei, as well as the five eastern prefectures of Inner Mongolia: Xilin Gol, Chifeng, Tongliao, Hinggan and Hulunbuir.

Premier Wen Jiabao held a State Council meeting on 10 September 2003 regarding the issue of reviving northeast China. The meeting saw the drafting of the document "Certain Opinions Regarding Implementing the Strategies of Reviving the Old Industrial Bases Including the Northeast", which would be jointly disseminated by the Central Committee of the CCP and the State Council in October 2003.

The State Council established a special Leading Group to define and adopt related strategies, which held its first meeting in August 2009 and the second in August 2010. The Chairman of the Leading Group is Premier Wen Jiabao.

Following the first meeting of the Leading Group, the revitalization strategy was affirmed and extended in a document of September 9, 2009. The State Council asked the Northeastern provinces to better coordinate their economic development strategies. As a result, the top party and government leaders of Liaoning, Jilin, Heilongjiang and Inner Mongolia met in Shenyang, capital of Liaoning for the first Northeast Summit in April 2010, and signed a framework agreement of 25 articles for cooperation and integrated regional development.

The core of the program is to revitalize the region's traditional industry, while speeding up development in aspects of structural regulation, regional cooperation, economic reform, the construction of an environment-friendly economy, and increased efforts in education, healthcare, and cultural projects.

In 2016, it was announced that 1.6 trillion RMB would be used to continue to revitalize the economy.

Cooperation with Russia, the two Koreas (North and South Korea) and Mongolia, as well as securing natural gas supplies will become important factors in this revitalisation program.

See also
Bohai Economic Rim
Yangtze River Delta Economic Zone
China Western Development
Rise of Central China Plan
Economy of China

External links
NE China Revitalization - Special Report
Asia Times Online: Reviving northeast China

References

Economic development in China